Erica May-Lynn Jarder (born 2 April 1986) is a Swedish athlete specializing in long jump. Jarder won the bronze medal in the long jump at the European Indoor Championships in Gothenburg on 2 March 2013.

Competition record

References

External links

1986 births
Living people
Swedish female long jumpers
Swedish female sprinters
World Athletics Championships athletes for Sweden
Athletes (track and field) at the 2016 Summer Olympics
Olympic athletes of Sweden
People from Täby Municipality
Sportspeople from Stockholm County
21st-century Swedish women